"Why Socialism?" is an article written by Albert Einstein in May 1949 that appeared in the first issue of the socialist journal Monthly Review. It addresses problems with capitalism, predatory economic competition, and growing wealth inequality. It highlights control of mass media by private capitalists making it difficult for citizens to arrive at objective conclusions, and political parties being influenced by wealthy financial backers resulting in an "oligarchy of private capital". Einstein concludes that these problems can only be corrected with planned economy which maintains a strong democracy to protect the rights of individuals.

Contents 

According to Einstein, the profit motive of a capitalist society, in conjunction with competition among capitalists, leads to unnecessary cycles of booms and depressions, and ultimately encourages selfishness instead of cooperation. In addition, the educational system of such a society would be severely undermined because people will educate themselves only to advance their careers. This results in the "crippling of individuals" and the erosion of human creativity. Unrestrained competition in a capitalist society leads to a huge waste of labor and causes economic anarchy, which Einstein denounces as the real source of capitalism's evil:

Einstein predicted that under such a capitalist society, political parties and politicians would be corrupted by financial contributions made by owners of large capital amounts, and the system "cannot be effectively checked even by a democratically organized political society". The essay concludes with Einstein's analysis on how to solve these problems through a planned economy:

Einstein asserts that a planned economy that adjusts to production would guarantee a livelihood to every member of society:

In his final words, Einstein cautioned that "a planned economy is not yet socialism", since it may also be accompanied by an "all-powerful" bureaucracy that leads to the "complete enslavement of the individual".

Motivation

Regarding his motivation for publishing the article, Einstein believed Monthly Review would be a good forum for socialist ideas:

See also

Political views of Albert Einstein

References

External links

 "Why Socialism?" on the Monthly Review (English)

1949 documents
Works by Albert Einstein
Works about socialism
Works originally published in American magazines